A natural nuclear fission reactor is a uranium deposit where self-sustaining nuclear chain reactions occur. The conditions under which a natural nuclear reactor could exist had been predicted in 1956 by Japanese American chemist Paul Kuroda. The remnants of an extinct or fossil nuclear fission reactor, where self-sustaining nuclear reactions have occurred in the past, can be verified by analysis of isotope ratios of uranium and of the fission products (and the stable daughter nuclides of those fission products). An example of this phenomenon was discovered in 1972 in Oklo, Gabon by French physicist Francis Perrin under conditions very similar to Kuroda's predictions.

Oklo is the only location where this phenomenon is known to have occurred, and consists of 16 sites with patches of centimeter-sized ore layers. Here self-sustaining nuclear fission reactions are thought to have taken place approximately 1.7 billion years ago, during the Statherian period of the Paleoproterozoic, and continued for a few hundred thousand years, probably averaging less than 100 kW of thermal power during that time.

History 
In May 1972 at the Tricastin uranium enrichment site at Pierrelatte in France, routine mass spectrometry comparing UF6 samples from the Oklo Mine, located in Gabon, showed a discrepancy in the amount of the  isotope. Normally the concentration is 0.72% while these samples had only 0.60%, a significant difference (some 17% less U-235 was contained in the samples than expected).  This discrepancy required explanation, as all civilian uranium handling facilities must meticulously account for all fissionable isotopes to ensure that none are diverted to the construction of nuclear weapons.  Furthermore since fissile material is why people mine uranium, a significant amount "going missing" was also of direct economic concern. 

Thus the French Commissariat à l'énergie atomique (CEA) began an investigation. A series of measurements of the relative abundances of the two most significant isotopes of the uranium mined at Oklo showed anomalous results compared to those obtained for uranium from other mines. Further investigations into this uranium deposit discovered uranium ore with a  concentration as low as 0.44% (almost 40% below the normal value). Subsequent examination of isotopes of fission products such as neodymium and ruthenium also showed anomalies, as described in more detail below. However, the trace radioisotope  did not deviate significantly in its concentration from other natural samples. In Oklo any possible deviation of  concentration present at the time the reactor was active would have long since decayed away.  must have also been present in higher than usual ratios during the time the reactor was operating, but due to its half life of  years being almost two orders of magnitude shorter than the time elapsed since the reactor operated, it has decayed to roughly  its original value and thus basically nothing and below any abilities of current equipment to detect.

A possible explanation was that the uranium ore had operated as a natural fission reactor in the distant geological past. Other observations led to the same conclusion, and on 25 September 1972 the CEA announced their finding that self-sustaining nuclear chain reactions had occurred on Earth about 2 billion years ago. Later, other natural nuclear fission reactors were discovered in the region.

Fission product isotope signatures

Neodymium 
Neodymium and other elements were found with isotopic compositions different from what is usually found on Earth. For example, Oklo contained less than 6% of the  isotope while natural neodymium contains 27%; however Oklo contained more of the  isotope.

Ruthenium 

Similar investigations into the isotopic ratios of ruthenium at Oklo found a much higher  concentration than otherwise naturally occurring (27–30% vs. 12.7%). It is clear that the fission ruthenium has a different isotope signature. On the timescale of when the reactors were in operation, very little (about 0.17 ppb)  decay to  will have occurred.

Mechanism 
The natural nuclear reactor formed when a uranium-rich mineral deposit became inundated with groundwater, which could act as a moderator for the neutrons produced by nuclear fission. A chain reaction took place, producing heat that caused the groundwater to boil away; without a moderator that could slow the neutrons, however, the reaction slowed or stopped. The reactor thus had a negative void coefficient of reactivity, something employed as a safety mechanism in human-made light water reactors. After cooling of the mineral deposit, the water returned, and the reaction restarted, completing a full cycle every 3 hours. The fission reaction cycles continued for hundreds of thousands of years and ended when the ever-decreasing fissile materials, coupled with the build-up of neutron poisons, no longer could sustain a chain reaction.

Fission of uranium normally produces five known isotopes of the fission-product gas xenon; all five have been found trapped in the remnants of the natural reactor, in varying concentrations. The concentrations of xenon isotopes, found trapped in mineral formations 2 billion years later, make it possible to calculate the specific time intervals of reactor operation: approximately 30 minutes of criticality followed by 2 hours and 30 minutes of cooling down (exponentially decreasing residual decay heat) to complete a 3-hour cycle. Xenon-135 is the strongest known neutron poison. However, it is not produced directly in appreciable amounts but rather as a decay product of Iodine-135 (or one of its parent nuclides). Xenon-135 itself is unstable and decays to Caesium-135 if not allowed to absorb neutrons. While Caesium-135 is relatively long lived, all Caesium-135 produced by the Oklo reactor has since decayed further to stable Barium-135. Meanwhile Xenon-136, the product of neutron capture in Xenon-135 only decays extremely slowly via double beta decay and thus scientists were able to determine the neutronics of this reactor by calculations based on those isotope ratios almost two billion years after it stopped fissioning uranium.

A key factor that made the reaction possible was that, at the time the reactor went critical 1.7 billion years ago, the fissile isotope  made up about 3.1% of the natural uranium, which is comparable to the amount used in some of today's reactors. (The remaining 96.9% was non-fissile  and roughly 55 ppm .) A natural nuclear reactor is therefore no longer possible on Earth without heavy water or graphite.

The Oklo uranium ore deposits are the only known sites in which natural nuclear reactors existed. Other rich uranium ore bodies would also have had sufficient uranium to support nuclear reactions at that time, but the combination of uranium, water and physical conditions needed to support the chain reaction was unique, as far as is currently known, to the Oklo ore bodies. It is also possible, that other natural nuclear fission reactors were once operating but have since been geologically disturbed so much as to be unrecognizable, possibly even "diluting" the uranium so far that the isotope ratio would no longer serve as a "fingerprint". Only a small part of the continental crust and no part of the oceanic crust reaches the age of the deposits at Oklo or an age during which isotope ratios of natural uranium would have allowed a self sustaining chain reaction with water as a moderator.

Another factor which probably contributed to the start of the Oklo natural nuclear reactor at 2 billion years, rather than earlier, was the increasing oxygen content in the Earth's atmosphere. Uranium is naturally present in the rocks of the earth, and the abundance of fissile  was at least 3% or higher at all times prior to reactor startup. Uranium is soluble in water only in the presence of oxygen. Therefore, increasing oxygen levels during the aging of the Earth may have allowed uranium to be dissolved and transported with groundwater to places where a high enough concentration could accumulate to form rich uranium ore bodies. Without the new aerobic environment available on Earth at the time, these concentrations probably could not have taken place.

Most of the non-volatile fission products and actinides have only moved centimeters in the veins during the last 2 billion years. Studies have suggested this as a useful natural analogue for nuclear waste disposal.

Relation to the atomic fine-structure constant
The natural reactor of Oklo has been used to check if the atomic fine-structure constant α might have changed over the past 2 billion years. That is because α influences the rate of various nuclear reactions. For example,  captures a neutron to become , and since the rate of neutron capture depends on the value of α, the ratio of the two samarium isotopes in samples from Oklo can be used to calculate the value of α from 2 billion years ago.

Several studies have analysed the relative concentrations of radioactive isotopes left behind at Oklo, and most have concluded that nuclear reactions then were much the same as they are today, which implies α was the same too.

See also
Deep geological repository
Mounana

References

Sources

External links

The natural nuclear reactor at Oklo: A comparison with modern nuclear reactors, Radiation Information Network, April 2005
Oklo Fossil Reactors

Nuclear reactors
Geography of Gabon
Nuclear physics
Nuclear fission
Radioactive waste repositories
Uranium
Nuclear reactors by type
Nuclear chemistry